The United Arab List (HaReshima HaAravit HaMe'uhedet; ,  al-Qā'ima al-'Arabiyya al-Muwaḥḥada), commonly known by its Hebrew acronym Ra'am, is an Arab political party in Israel and the political wing of the Southern Branch of the Islamic movement. It was part of the Joint List but left the alliance on 28 January 2021. In 2021 it formally joined a coalition of parties forming the thirty-sixth government. It is currently led by Mansour Abbas.

History

The party was established prior to the 1996 election, unrelated to the original United Arab List that existed in the late 1970s and early 1980s. It was joined in an electoral alliance by the Arab Democratic Party (which held two seats in the outgoing parliament) and the southern faction of the Islamic Movement, led by Sheikh Abdullah Nimar Darwish. The party initially went under the title of Mada-Ra'am, Mada being the acronym and common name for the Arab Democratic Party. In the election, the party won four seats. During the Knesset term, the Arab Democratic Party became a faction within the United Arab List, and its name was dropped from the party title.

The 1999 election saw the party increase its share of the vote and pick up five seats. However, internal disagreements saw three MKs leave; Muhamad Kanan and Tawfik Khatib left and established the Arab National Party, whilst Hashem Mahameed formed the National Unity – National Progressive Alliance party. In the 2003 election, the party's support dropped by more than a third, with the party only just crossing the electoral threshold of 2%, and winning only two seats.

For the 2006 election, the party entered an alliance with Ahmad Tibi's Ta'al party. Running together, the alliance won four seats, three of which were taken by the United Arab List. The partys' alliance was maintained for the 2009 election, which initially saw the Israeli Central Elections Committee ban the party from participating, but this was overturned by the Supreme Court of Israel. In the election, the alliance again won four seats. Shortly before the 2013 election, Taleb el-Sana left the party to sit as an independent Arab Democratic Party member.

After the electoral threshold to gain Knesset seats was raised from 2% to 3.25%, the party joined with Hadash, Balad, Ta'al, and the Islamic Movement to form the Joint List for the 2015 election. For the April 2019 election, it ran on a list with Balad. The party again ran as part of the Joint List in the 2020 election.

Coalition government
In the 2021 elections the party won four seats in the Knesset. Within the fragmented political landscape of Israel, these seats gave the party the role of kingmaker in determining the next government after Benjamin Netanyahu failed to form one. On 2 June 2021, party leader Mansour Abbas signed an agreement to form a coalition government, the first time an independent Arab party became a member of the Israeli government, and the first time in more than 50 years that any Arab party formed part of the Israeli government; a photograph of Abbas, sitting with Yair Lapid and Naftali Bennett, signing the coalition agreement was widely circulated. The agreement included guarantees that more than 53 billion shekels (US$16 billion) would be spent to improve infrastructure and reduce crime in Arab towns, provisions protecting homes built without permits in Arab villages, and recognition for Bedouin towns in the Negev desert.

On 28 October 2021 the cabinet approved a plan to spend US$9.4 billion to improve employment opportunities and health services for Israeli Arabs and improve housing, technology, and infrastructure in Arab areas; it included a further US$1 billion to address high crime rates in Arab areas. In the scale of funding range of issues in the Arab community addressed, the plan had little precedent in Israeli history, and Abbas and Ra'am were widely credited with pushing forward what Abbas called a "historic step" forward for Arab Israelis. The plan was signed into law when the budget passed on 4 November.

At the United Arab List's urging, the coalition government has recognized several Bedouin villages and has connected thousands of previously-illegal homes to the electrical grid.

Ideology and support
Under Abbas's direction, the United Arab List advocates for full-fledged political involvement with the domestic politics of Israel in order to improve the quality of life of Arab Israelis, particularly with respect to crime, employment opportunities, housing, and infrastructure; this is a departure from other Arab parties, which historically form part of the opposition and focus on the larger Israeli-Palestinian conflict.

The party supports the two-state solution, and the creation of a Palestinian state in the West Bank and Gaza Strip, with East Jerusalem as its capital. Its constituency consists mostly of religious or nationalist Israeli Arabs, and enjoys particular popularity among the Negev Bedouin: in the 2009 election, 80% of residents of Bedouin communities voted for the party.

The Islamic Movement also operates in poor Arab towns and villages, as well as in Bedouin settlements, to mobilize voters. The southern faction of the Islamic Movement is now the dominant force in the party, whilst other factions include the Arab National Party. The Islamic Movement's advisory religious body, known as the Majlis-ash-Shura (Shura Council), has guided the party's votes in parliament.

Election results

Knesset membership

Current Knesset members
Mansour Abbas
Walid Taha
Walid al-Huashla
Iman Khatib-Yasin
Yasser Hujirat

Former Knesset members
Taleb el-Sana (1996–2012)
Abdulmalik Dehamshe (1996–2006)
Mazen Ghnaim (2021-2022)
Muhamad Kanan (1999–2001)
Tawfik Khatib (1996–2001)
Hashem Mahameed (1999–2002)
Ibrahim Sarsur (2006–2019)
Masud Ghnaim (2009–2019)
Taleb Abu Arar (2013–2019)
Abd al-Hakim Hajj Yahya (2019–2020)
Said al-Harumi (2017–2021)

See also
Arab members of the Knesset

References

External links
  (archived)
Islamic Movement 
United Arab List Knesset website
Mada-Ra'am Knesset website
Ra'am-Ta'al Knesset website

 
Arab nationalism in Israel
Political parties in Israel
Arab political parties in Israel
Political parties established in 1996
Conservative parties in Israel
Islamic democratic political parties
Islamism in Israel
Social conservative parties
Organizations that oppose LGBT rights
1996 establishments in Israel